The 2003 Tropicana 400 was the stock car race of the 2003 NASCAR Winston Cup Series season and the third iteration of the event. The race was held on Sunday, July 13, 2003, in Joliet, Illinois, at Chicagoland Speedway, a 1.5 miles (2.41 km) tri-oval speedway. The race took the scheduled 267 laps to complete. At race's end, Penske Racing South driver Ryan Newman would stretch out his fuel mileage well enough to coast to the line and win his fourth career NASCAR Winston Cup Series win and his third of the season. To fill out the podium, Tony Stewart of Joe Gibbs Racing and Jimmie Johnson of Hendrick Motorsports would finish second and third, respectively.

Background 

Chicagoland Speedway is a 1.5 miles (2.41 km) tri-oval speedway in Joliet, Illinois, southwest of Chicago. The speedway opened in 2001 and currently hosts NASCAR racing. Until 2011, the speedway also hosted the IndyCar Series, recording numerous close finishes including the closest finish in IndyCar history. The speedway is owned and operated by International Speedway Corporation and located adjacent to Route 66 Raceway.

Entry list

Practice

First practice 
The first practice session was held on Friday, July 11, at 11:20 AM CST, and would last for 2 hours.

Second practice 
The second practice session was held on Saturday, July 12, at 9:30 AM CST, and would last for 45 minutes.

Third and final practice 
The third and final practice session, sometimes referred to as Happy Hour, was held on Saturday, July 12, at 11:10 AM CST, and would last for 45 minutes.

Qualifying 
Qualifying was held on Friday, July 11, at 3:05 PM CST. Each driver would have two laps to set a fastest time; the fastest of the two would count as their official qualifying lap. The session would commence after a near two-hour rain delay. Positions 1-36 would be decided on time, while positions 37-43 would be based on provisionals. Six spots are awarded by the use of provisionals based on owner's points. The seventh is awarded to a past champion who has not otherwise qualified for the race. If no past champ needs the provisional, the next team in the owner points will be awarded a provisional.

Jason Keller would be the only driver to fail to qualify.

Full qualifying results

Race results

References 

2003 NASCAR Winston Cup Series
NASCAR races at Chicagoland Speedway
July 2003 sports events in the United States
2003 in sports in Illinois